Sophia Wilson was a Japanese courtesan who married Captain John Wilson. She anglicised her name from Naka Yamazaki to Sophia Wilson, and adopted her son, Nils Wilson.  Upon her marriage, she renounced her membership in the Yamazaki koseki, or family record, became a Swedish citizen, and was baptized in the Church of England (Anglican).

Sophia Wilson was a confidant and neighbor of Tsuru Glover, and together with Tsuru's friendship with the Japanese Ambassador to Italy, the stories of Naka and Tsuru may have been incorporated in Giacomo Puccini`s Madam Butterfly.

Wilson and her husband are buried in the Yokohama Foreign Cemetery on Yokohama Bluff, a gaijin bochi, where her granddaughter, Vivienne Joy Wilson Vaughn is also buried. Their gravestone is marked with the compass and angle, a traditional mark of Freemasonry.

References 
The Search for Madame Butterfly, and the Evolution of Early Mixed-Culture Myths

History of the foreign relations of Japan
British people of Japanese descent
People in Kyushu
Swedish people of Japanese descent